Babacar Diop is a name. People with that name include:

 Babacar Diop (Mauritanian footballer)
 Babacar Diop (Senegalese footballer)

Diop, Babacar